Experimental Biology and Medicine is a monthly peer-reviewed scientific journal that covers experimental biological and medical research. The editor-in-chief is Steven R. Goodman (SUNY Upstate Medical University). It was established in 1903 as Proceedings of the Society for Experimental Biology and Medicine and is published by SAGE Publishing on behalf of the Society for Experimental Biology and Medicine. The journal acquired its current name in 2001.

Abstracting and indexing 
The journal is abstracted and indexed in Scopus and the Science Citation Index. According to the Journal Citation Reports, its 2016 impact factor is 2.688, ranking 59th out of 128 journals in the category "Medicine, Research & Experimental".

See also 
 Proceedings of the Society for Experimental Biology and Medicine (Proc. Soc. Exp. Biol. Med.),

References

External links 
 
  Society for Experimental Biology and Medicine

SAGE Publishing academic journals
English-language journals
Monthly journals
General medical journals
Publications established in 1903
Biology journals